Harold Frederic Reinhart  (1891 – 17 August 1969), was an American-born rabbi who was senior minister at West London Synagogue and the founding rabbi of Westminster Synagogue.

Reinhardt had degrees from the University of Cincinnati and the University of Chicago. He received a doctorate in divinity from the Hebrew Union College in Cincinnati, and was ordained there in 1915.

Reinhard was Rabbi at Reform Jewish congregations in Gary, Indiana, Baton Rouge, Los Angeles and Sacramento, California before moving, in 1929, to the United Kingdom to continue his rabbinical career. He succeeded the Rev. Morris Joseph as senior minister at West London Synagogue in 1929. He remained in post until 1957, when he resigned to found what became Westminster Synagogue, where he was Rabbi from 1957 until his death in 1969.

He died on 17 August 1969 and, after cremation,  his ashes were buried at Golders Green Jewish Cemetery. His papers are held at Southampton University.

References

1891 births
1967 deaths
American Reform rabbis
British Reform rabbis
Burials at Golders Green Jewish Cemetery
Doctors of Divinity
Hebrew Union College – Jewish Institute of Religion alumni
Rabbis from London
Religious leaders from Oregon
University of Chicago alumni
University of Cincinnati alumni
West London Synagogue
20th-century American rabbis